Łódź Arturówek is a commuter railway station located in the city of Łódź, Poland, in Bałuty district, in the neighbourhood of Łagiewniki forest, on the circular line between Łódź Widzew and Zgierz stations.

Initially opened in 1972, the station was unused from 1988 until 2014, when it was rebuilt and reopened as part of Łódź Commuter Railway (ŁKA), serving only ŁKA trains from Łódź to Zgierz.

References 

Railway stations in Poland opened in 1972
Arturówek
Railway stations served by Łódzka Kolej Aglomeracyjna